Irresistible may refer to:

Film and television
 Irresistible (2006 film), an Australian mystery drama by Ann Turner
 Irresistible (2020 film), an American political comedy by Jon Stewart
 "Irresistible" (Stargate Atlantis), a television episode
 "Irresistible" (The X-Files), a television episode

Music

Albums
 Irresistible (Jessica Simpson album) or the title song (see below), 2001
 Irresistible (Tammi Terrell album), 1969
 Irresistible, by Celia Cruz, 1995
 Irresistible, by Company B, 1998
 Irresistible, by Pablo Ruiz, 1992

Songs
 "Irresistible" (Cathy Dennis song), 1992
 "Irresistible" (The Corrs song), 2000
 "Irresistible" (Fall Out Boy song), 2015
 "Irresistible" (Jessica Simpson song), 2001
 "Irresistible" (Stéphanie song) or "Ouragan", by Princess Stéphanie of Monaco, 1986
 "Irresistible" (Steve Harley & Cockney Rebel song), 1985
 "Irresistible" (Wisin & Yandel song), 2010
 "Irresistible", by Blair St. Clair from Call My Life, 2018
 "Irresistible", by Deafheaven from Sunbather, 2013
 "Irresistible", by One Direction from Take Me Home, 2012
 "Irresistible (Westside Connection)", by Mariah Carey from Charmbracelet, 2002

Other uses 
 HMS Irresistible, at least four ships of the Royal Navy
 Irresistible (color), a shade of cerise

See also
 
 Irresistible force (disambiguation)
 Unstoppable (disambiguation)
 Ear-Resistible, a 2000 album by The Temptations